When Bastards Go to Hell is an album released under the name The Dogs D'Amour in 2004. The album differs largely from all of the previous releases under the name Dogs D'Amour, both stylistically and in terms of band members.

Tyla played most instruments on the album, with his wife Yella. It is essentially similar to many of the solo albums Tyla released as a solo artist around this period, it has received generally negative responses from the band's fanbase.

Track listing
 "Ain't No Loser... Babe"  	
 "Barbed Wire Ball"  	
 "Shadow Town"  	
 "Bad Habit Motel"  	
 "Doomsday Times"  	
 "Just One"  	
 "X-Generation"  	
 "No One But You"  	
 "4am"  	
 "Waiting for the Next"  	
 "Grace of God"  	
 "What Price?"  	
 "When Bastards Go to Hell"  	
 "The Vampyres"

Band
Tyla - guitars, bass, lead vocals, percussion
Yella - vocals
Juli - drums
Henry Twinch - keys

Guests
The following musicians featured on track 13 only.
Darrell Bath - guitars
Dill Davis - drums
Dan Turner - lead guitar
Chris Hayter - rhythm guitar

References

2004 albums
The Dogs D'Amour albums